Secret Origins is a Big Finish Productions audio drama featuring Lisa Bowerman as Bernice Summerfield, a character from the spin-off media based on the long-running British science fiction television series Doctor Who.

Plot 
Bernice's son, Peter, is kidnapped by the seemingly immortal Mr. Frost. Bernice travels to the ruined city of Buenos Aires to rescue Peter.

Cast
Bernice Summerfield - Lisa Bowerman
Peter Summerfield - Thomas Grant
Robyn - Donna Berlin
Frost - Doug Bradley

External links
Big Finish Productions - Professor Bernice Summerfield: Secret Origins

Secret Origins
Fiction set in the 27th century